Edward Blythin (October 10, 1884 – February 14, 1958) was an American politician and jurist of the Republican party who served as the 46th mayor of Cleveland, Ohio.

Life and career
Blythin was born October 10, 1884, in the small village of Newmarket in Flintshire, Wales, United Kingdom. His father was a farmer.  Relatively well-educated, he became a bookkeeper for a coal company in Wales.

In 1906, he emigrated, ending up in Cleveland, Ohio, where he landed another bookkeeping job, for a real estate agency, a job he held for 10 years. During this time, he attended Cleveland State University College of Law at night, earning his law degree in 1916.

Blythin then turned to the practice of law. In 1935, Blythin accepted appointment as an assistant to the Cleveland city law director. He became law director in 1940. In January 1941, when Harold H. Burton resigned as Cleveland mayor in order to take a seat in the United States Senate, Blythin, as law director, automatically succeeded Burton to the mayor's office. In November, however, Blythin failed to win election to the seat, losing to Democrat Frank Lausche.

In 1943, Blythin left private law practice to accept an executive position at Western Reserve University.

In 1949, Blythin was elected to a judgeship in the Cuyahoga County Court of Common Pleas, where he served until his death. During his tenure on the court, Blythin presided over the notorious 1954 murder trial of Sam Sheppard.  His stewardship of the trial was later overturned by the United States Supreme Court which termed the trial "a Roman Holiday."  In fact, famous columnist Dorothy Kilgallen reputedly wrote that in a private conference just prior to the trial beginning, Blythin told her, in his opinion, Sheppard was guilty. According to friends and family members, this private conference never occurred but was Ms Killgallen's retaliation for the judge admonishing her for showing up late and disrupting the court proceedings. However, the appellate record contains affidavits signed by others who claimed to have heard Judge Blythin make statements similar to the statement Killgallen claimed to have heard.

Personal life and death
Blythin married Jane Rankin on April 3, 1913, and they had five children, Robert, Arthur, Glen, Jane, and William.

Judge Blythin suffered a severe heart attack at his home in Parma Heights, Ohio, on February 12, 1958. He was admitted to Lutheran Hospital in Cleveland, where he suffered a second heart attack and died on February 14.  He was buried in Lake View Cemetery in Cleveland.

References

 The Encyclopedia Of Cleveland History by Cleveland Bicentennial Commission (Cleveland, Ohio), David D. Van Tassel (Editor), and John J. Grabowski (Editor) 

1884 births
1958 deaths
Mayors of Cleveland
20th-century American politicians
People from Flintshire
People from Parma Heights, Ohio